Penny Cousineau-Levine (born March 31, 1947) is a Canadian photography theorist, curator, artist and professor.

Life
Cousineau-Levine was born in Fredericton, New Brunswick. She holds a Bachelor of Arts in English literature from the University of Manitoba (1969) and a Master of Fine Arts from the Visual Studies Workshop in Rochester, New York.

Cousineau is a full professor in the department of visual arts at the University of Ottawa.

Work
Cousineau-Levine is known for her book Faking Death: Canadian Art Photography and the Canadian Imagination, published by McGill-Queen's University Press in 2003. In this publication, she explores the specificity of Canadian photography from 1950 to 2000. The book includes reproductions and observations on more than 120 Canadian photographers, including Michel Lambeth, Charles Gagnon, Diana Thorneycroft, Sandra Semchuk and Raymonde April.

Collections
Several of Cousineau-Levine's early photographic works are included in the permanent collection of the National Gallery of Canada.

References

1947 births
Living people
Canadian academics of fine arts
Canadian art historians
People from Fredericton
University of Manitoba alumni
Academic staff of the University of Ottawa
Visual Studies Workshop alumni
Canadian women historians
Canadian women curators